John Ambrose is a Malaysian politician and the incumbent Senator since 2018. Formerly a member of the United Malays National Organisation (UMNO) that is also the main and the largest component of the Barisan Nasional (BN) coalition, he was appointed Senator on 16 January 2018. However, following the BN's crushing defeat at the 2018 election, he quit the UMNO in December and joined the Malaysian United Indigenous Party (PPBM) on 15 March 2019. He was re-appointed to the position in 2021.

He is of Kadazan-Dusun descent and a Christian.

Honours
  :
  Commander of the Order of Kinabalu (PGDK) – Datuk (2007)

References 

Malaysian politicians
Living people
Former United Malays National Organisation politicians
Year of birth missing (living people)
Malaysian United Indigenous Party politicians
Commanders of the Order of Kinabalu